The UKF College of Engineering and Technology is an engineering college situated in Kalluvathukal Panchayath of Kollam district in Kerala, India. It is situated 9 km away from Varkala town, 24 km away from Kollam City and 48 km away from state capital city Trivandrum. Established in 2009, it is affiliated to the Kerala Technological University headquartered in Trivandrum city. UKF College of Engineering & Technology is owned and managed by the Universal Knowledge Foundation Trust.

Academics 

The UKF College of Engineering & Technology has been accorded approval by the All India Council for Technical Education (AICTE) for conducting 4-year (8-semester) B Tech degree course in various branches. The college is affiliated to the Kerala Technological University and the courses offered are as per the new scheme and syllabus of the University.

Nearest Cities/Towns
 Varkala - 9 km
 Paravur - 10 km
 Attingal -18 km
 Kollam - 24 km
 Kottarakkara - 28 km
 Punalur - 42 km
 Trivandrum - 46 km
 Karunagappally - 47 km
 Adoor - 47 km
 Nedumangad - 48 km

Location 
The college is located in Kollam district at Meenambalam, a village near Parippally on the National Highway 66.

References

Engineering colleges in Kollam
Colleges affiliated to the University of Kerala
Educational institutions established in 2009
2009 establishments in Kerala